Andean region may refer to:

 Andes, mountain chain in South America
 Andean Region (Venezuela)
 Andean Region, Colombia